Sankt Goar-Oberwesel is a former Verbandsgemeinde ("collective municipality") in the Rhein-Hunsrück district, in Rhineland-Palatinate, Germany. It is situated on the left bank of the Rhine, approx. 30 km southeast of Koblenz. Its seat was in Oberwesel. On 1 January 2020 it was merged into the new Verbandsgemeinde Hunsrück-Mittelrhein.

The Verbandsgemeinde Sankt Goar-Oberwesel consisted of the following Ortsgemeinden ("local municipalities"):

 Damscheid
 Laudert
 Niederburg
 Oberwesel
 Perscheid
 Sankt Goar
 Urbar
 Wiebelsheim

Former Verbandsgemeinden in Rhineland-Palatinate
Middle Rhine